The Michigan State University College of Law (Michigan State Law or MSU Law) is the law school of Michigan State University, a public research university in East Lansing, Michigan. Established in 1891 as the Detroit College of Law, it was the first law school in the Detroit, Michigan area and the second in the state of Michigan. In October 2018, the college began a process to fully integrate into Michigan State University, changing from a private to a public law school. The integration with Michigan State University was finalized on August 17, 2020.

The college is nationally ranked within U.S. News & World Report's 201 Best Law Schools, landing in the 91st spot in the 2023 rankings. The Michigan State Law Review, a legal journal published by MSU Law students, was ranked 48th in the 2022 Washington & Lee University School of Law ranking.

For the class entering in 2021, the school had a 48.05% acceptance rate, 33.14% of those accepted enrolled, and entering students had a median LSAT score of 156 and a median undergraduate GPA of 3.59.

For the 2020 graduating class, 72.5% of graduates obtained full-time, long term bar passage required employment (i.e. employment as attorneys), while 7.9% were not employed part or full-time in any capacity, within ten months after graduation.

Notable alumni include current Governor of Michigan Gretchen Whitmer, current Michigan Supreme Court Chief Justice Elizabeth T. Clement, former Michigan Supreme Court Justice and mayor of Detroit Dennis Archer, former Michigan Supreme Court Justice and United States federal judge George Clifton Edwards Jr., former Michigan gubernatorial candidate Geoffrey Fieger, former Michigan Senate majority leader and former U.S. Representative Mike Bishop, and former mayor of East Lansing Mark Meadows.

History

Detroit College of Law 

Detroit College of Law opened in 1891 with 69 students and was incorporated in 1893. Among the first class of students to graduate were a future circuit judge and an ambassador. It was the oldest continuously operating independent law school in the United States until it was assimilated by MSU in 1995.  The college was affiliated with the Detroit Young Men's Christian Association.

In 1937, the school broke ground and relocated to a new building at 130 East Elizabeth Street in Detroit, where it stayed until 1997. The Building was designed by architect George DeWitt Mason.  It had been located at the former Detroit College of Medicine building on St. Antoine Street from 1892 to 1913; and the Detroit "YMCA" building from 1913 to 1924; the ground on which the building stood was under a 99-year lease from the YMCA. The last location of the Detroit College of Law in Downtown Detroit is commemorated by a plaque at Comerica Park, the home stadium of the Detroit Tigers baseball team, which now occupies the site.

Affiliation with Michigan State University
The college became affiliated with Michigan State University in 1995 to enhance the college's curriculum and reputation. It relocated to East Lansing in 1997, when its 99-year lease with the Detroit YMCA expired, and the original building was demolished to make way for Comerica Park. The newly located college was called "Detroit College of Law at Michigan State University". The affiliation was celebrated at a function where former President and Michigan native Gerald Ford joined more than 2,500 guests at the Wharton Center for Performing Arts Great Hall. Ford characterized the affiliation between Michigan State University and the Detroit College of Law "a bold new venture" that presents "a singular opportunity to help shape the changing face of American legal education well into the next century." In April 2004, the school changed its name to the MSU College of Law, becoming more closely aligned academically with MSU. MSU Law is currently fully integrated as a constituent college of the university: academically, financially, and structurally.

Joan Howarth began her deanship at Michigan State University College of Law on July 1, 2008 and was the first female dean in MSU Law's 117-year history. Beforehand, she was a professor at the William S. Boyd School of Law at the University of Nevada, Las Vegas, since 2001.  She retired at the end of the 2015-16 school year. Lawrence Ponoroff became the Dean in the fall of 2016, and he served in that role until the end of December 2019. 
On October 26, 2018, MSU's Board of Directors voted to fully integrate the College of Law into the University, thereby completing its transition from a private, independent institution to a public law school. At the time, Dean Lawrence Ponoroff said, "Since the original affiliation in 1995, the relationship between the university and the law college has grown increasingly closer and, at each stage, resounded in benefits to both institutions." The full integration was undertaken in order to facilitate collaboration between the law school and other divisions of MSU, opening up development in core areas of curricular strength such as social justice; innovation and entrepreneurship; and business and regulatory law. 

Melanie B. Jacobs, professor of law, was then appointed as the law college’s interim dean, beginning in January 2020 and under her tenure, the integration of the College of Law into the University was completed on August 17, 2020. On June 1, 2021, Linda Sheryl Greene became Dean and MSU Foundation Professor of Law, and is the Inaugural Dean of the College of Law. Dean Greene (a noted scholar in constitutional law, civil rights law and sports law) was previously the Evjue-Bascom Professor of Law at the University of Wisconsin-Madison.

Academic programs 

MSU Law also houses the Center for Law, Technology & Innovation (CLTI), formerly named the ReInvent Law Program, and LegalRnD; the Indigenous Law & Policy Center (ILPC); and the Geoffrey N. Fieger Trial Practice Institute (TPI).

Academic journals and publications
Law journals at the law school are nationally ranked and include: 
 Michigan State Law Review, the school's flagship journal, ranked 48th among flagship printed journals ranked by Washington and Lee in 2022.
 Michigan State International Law Review 
 Animal and Natural Resource Law Review

Additionally, the school also publishes Spartan Lawyer, the law college's bi-annual magazine. Formerly, the school published the Journal of Business & Securities Law.

Notable faculty

Current 
 Rosemarie Aquilina, circuit court judge in Michigan who sentenced Larry Nassar in the USA Gymnastics sex abuse scandal involving Michigan State.
 Brian C. Kalt, legal scholar and writer who is known for his research on constitutional law, the presidency, and juries.
 Jim Chen, one of four Asian-Americans who has been a dean at an American law school (University of Louisville School of Law).
 Lawrence Ponoroff, professor at MSU Law and former Dean of James E. Rogers College of Law, Tulane Law School, and MSU Law.
 Robert P. Young Jr., former Justice of the Michigan Supreme Court.

Former 
 Elizabeth Price Foley, legal theorist and current Professor of Law at Florida International University College of Law.
Allen L. Lanstra, litigation partner at Skadden, Arps, Slate, Meagher & Flom LLP.
 Donald Laverdure, former director of the American Indian Law Program at MSU Law and oversaw the Bureau of Indian Affairs and Bureau of Indian Education under the presidency of Barack Obama.
 David McKeague, Senior United States Circuit Judge of the United States Court of Appeals for the Sixth Circuit.
 Richard D. McLellan,  Chairman of the Michigan Law Revision Commission and private practice attorney.
 Stacy Erwin Oakes, member of the Michigan House of Representatives and Minority Whip representing Michigan's 95th District.
 Bradford Stone, commercial law maven and theorist, Stetson University College of Law Charles A. Dana Professor of Law Emeritus, author of several editions of Uniform Commercial Code in a Nutshell and  coauthor of Commercial Transactions Under the Uniform Commercial Code.
 Melissa L. Tatum, research professor and former director of the Indigenous Peoples Law and Policy Program at James E. Rogers College of Law.

Notable alumni

Judges 
 Dennis Archer, former Justice of the Michigan Supreme Court and former mayor of Detroit, Michigan
 Elizabeth T. Clement, Justice of the Michigan Supreme Court since 2017
 George Crockett III, Judge of the Recorder's Court (Detroit) (renamed the Wayne County Circuit Court) from 1977 to 2003
 George Clifton Edwards Jr., Judge of the United States Court of Appeals for the Sixth Circuit
 Bernard A. Friedman, Judge of the United States District Court for the Eastern District of Michigan
 Diane Marie Hathaway, former Justice of the Michigan Supreme Court
 Ira W. Jayne, chief judge, Wayne County Circuit Court for 27 years
 Richard Fred Suhrheinrich, Judge of the United States Court of Appeals for the Sixth Circuit

Politicians 
 Mike Bishop, Michigan Senate majority leader from 2002–10 and U.S. Representative for Michigan's 8th congressional district from 2015-2018
 Christopher D. Dingell, state senator and judge
 Geoffrey Fieger, attorney and former Michigan gubernatorial candidate
 Orville L. Hubbard, former mayor of Dearborn, Michigan
 Kwame Kilpatrick, former mayor of Detroit, Michigan
 Mark Meadows, former mayor of East Lansing a former member of the Michigan House of Representatives
 Steve Pestka, former member of the Michigan House of Representatives, judge, and a Kent County, Michigan commissioner
 Brian Sims, Democratic representative for the Pennsylvania House of Representatives, 182nd District
 Gretchen Whitmer, 49th Governor of Michigan

Public figures 
 Ivan Boesky, former American stock trader infamous for his prominent role in an insider trading scandal that occurred in the United States during the mid-1980s resulting in his conviction including a record $100 million fine.
 Ella Bully-Cummings, chief of police of Detroit, Michigan, from 2003 to 2008
 John Z. DeLorean, automobile engineer and executive; attended, but dropped out
 Lowell W. Perry, former government official, businessman, broadcaster, and the first African-American assistant coach in the National Football League
W. Clement Stone, businessman, philanthropist and New Thought self-help book author; dropped out after a year

References

Notes

Citations

Further reading

External links
 Official website
 ABA Disclosures

Michigan State University
Michigan State University campus
Law schools in Michigan
Education in Lansing, Michigan
Educational institutions established in 1891
1891 establishments in Michigan
Universities and colleges in Ingham County, Michigan